AllStar, sometimes referred as La Secta AllStar is the second album released by the Puerto Rican rock band La Secta AllStar. It was released independently in 2001 and includes the hit songs "Dame lo Que Quieras", "Asesino" and "Eso es Vivir".

Track listing 
 "Sequía"
 "Dame lo Que Quieras"
 "Asesino"
 "X"
 "Cruzado Pero Claro"
 "Vino Viejo"
 "Canaguey"
 "Por Qué Volver"
 "Dámela"
 "Eso Es Vivir"
 "End of the Story"
 "Asesino [Vampy Dance Remix]"

2001 albums
La Secta AllStar albums